Cabin Fever! is the third studio album of Rasputina released in 2002 with Instinct Records. It is noteworthy for its use of industrial influences, particularly  the distorted cello.

Track listing

Critical reception
Jamie Kiffel, in a review for Lollipop Magazine, said "The smell of death still permeates every track. Yet the sweet stink never gets tiresome, thanks to Rasputina’s uncanny ability to sniff out increasingly bizarre permutations of the subject a la Edward Gorey," and "For all its talk of death, this is a sexy album with gutsy deliveries suggesting that, for all its tiny stillness, the doll in the coffin really does have powers."

Our Lies
Around mid 2001, Melora Creager held a contest for the band's mailing list subscribers, asking for fans to send back lies to be used as lyrics for a new song, which became the track Our Lies. Fourteen copies of a CD single version of the song were created as contest prizes, one for each of the 14 winners. The song was rerecorded for Cabin Fever!, and the contest winners were credited as writers in the liner notes.

Album details
Original Release Date: April 9, 2002
Label: Instinct Records
Recording Mode: Stereo
Recording Type: Studio
Producer: Melora Creager
Distributor: Ryko Distribution
Rasputina: Melora Creager (vocals, dulcimer, cello, piano, programming), K. Cowperthwaite, Nana Bornant (cello, background vocals).
Additional Personnel: Philosophy Major (drums).

References

2002 albums
Rasputina (band) albums